Tillandsia sucrei is a species in the genus Tillandsia. This species is endemic to Brazil.

Cultivars
 Tillandsia 'Pink Sugar'
 Tillandsia 'Pink Truffles'

References

BSI Cultivar Registry Retrieved 11 October 2009

sucrei
Endemic flora of Brazil